The Syracuse Orange field hockey team is the intercollegiate field hockey program representing Syracuse University. The school competes in the Atlantic Coast Conference of NCAA Division I field hockey.

The team plays its home games at the J.S. Coyne Stadium on the university campus in Syracuse, New York. Syracuse has won one NCAA Championship as well as 9 conference regular season titles and 6 conference tournaments since the creation of the field hockey program in 1972. Current head coach Ange Bradley is coaching her 14th season with the Orange.

History 
Field hockey team played its first season in 1971-72 and had a record of 1-3-1.  Syracuse played its first game against Potsdam, losing 0-4. The team began competing in Division-I in 1982. In 2008, the team was ranked No. 1, capturing the top spot in the polls for the first time in Syracuse history.

Head coaches
In nearly 50 years of the programs existence, only three coaches have coached the team. The first head coach Muriel K. Smith served as the head coach for both the field hockey and women’s basketball head coach for six seasons. She led the field hockey team to a 22-16-7 record from 1972-1977.

Kathleen Parker served as the head coach for 28 seasons from 1978 until 2006. She was named the Big East coach of the year in 1993, 1994, 1995, 2001. Parker led the team to a 316-214-14 record and 20 winning seasons. She was named to the NFHCA Hall of Fame in 2006.

Current head coach Ange Bradley  was hired by Athletic director Daryl Gross in 2006. The team was soon ranked No. 1 in October 2008, holding the top spot in the polls for the first time in Syracuse history. As of 2021, the program made 11 NCAA Tournament appearances in her 14 year of coaching at Syracuse. Bradley is a five-time conference Coach of the Year (ACC: 1; Big East: 4). She was named the Big East coach of the year in 2007, 2009, 2010, 2012 and the ACC Coach of the Year in 2015  after winning the national championship. Bradley was also named the NFHCA National Coach of the Year in 2015.

Wins and records

All-time record 
, the program has compiled an all-time record of 553-228-21. The program has won nine conference regular season championships, six league tournament championships. In 2016, The team recorded its 500th victory all-time with a 8-0 win against Temple.

NCAA appearances and 2015 National championship
Since 1972, Syracuse has accumulated a total of 14 appearances in the NCAA tournament. In 1993, Syracuse made their first NCAA Tournament appearance against Penn, winning 3-0.

In 1981, the Orange finished runner-up for the AIAW Division II National Championship, losing to Lock Haven in the championship game.

In 2015 the Orange won their first NCAA championship by defeating North Carolina in the final by a score of 4–2. The victory made them the first women's team at the university to win a national championship. This record-breaking squad had 21-1 record.

Individual honors 
Syracuse has produced two olympians, 10 U.S. National Team players, and 48 All-Americans, including six three-time All-Americans.

 Olympians (2): Shannon Taylor (2012) and Alyssa Manley (2016) have played for the United States women's national field hockey team.

 National team players (10): Julie Williamson, (1993), Laura Fitzpatrick  (1997), Audrey Latsko (2000), Michelle Marks (2000), Shannon Taylor (2010-12), Jordan Page (2012-13), Alyssa Manley (2012-13), Alyssa Manley (2015-16), Jess Jecko (2016), Laura Hurff (2015-16).

 Honda Award: Alyssa Manley (2015)

 BIG East Player(s) of the Year: Julie Williamson (1994), Jodi Carter (1995), Kristin Aronowicz (2001), and Heather Susek (2011)

 Total All-Americans: 48 (total 52 selections) made up of 16 First-Team All-Americans, 16 Second-Team All-Americans, and 16 Third-Team All-Americans. Kelly Larkin (1991) was the first-ever All-Americans for the Orange.
Three-time All-Americans are Julie Williamson 1992-94, Martina Loncarica 2008-10, Laura Hahnefeldt 2010, 2012/13, Alyssa Manley 2013-15, Laura Hurff 2015-17, Roos Weers 2016-18.
Two-time All-Americans are Heather Chase (1994, 95), Audrey Latsko (2000, 02), Lindsey Conrad (2008, 09), Heather Susek (2010, 11), Kelsey Millman (2011, 12), Emma Russell (2014, 15), Lies Lagerweij (2016, 17), and Charlotte de Vries (2019, 20)

 Total All-Conference selections: 114 of 89 came from the Big East years and 25 from the ACC.

Stadium 

J.S. Coyne Stadium, named after J. Stanley Coyne who donated $600,000 for a synthetic field surface, was dedicated in 1975. The team initially practiced in front of the Women's Building on an unkempt field with overgrown grass. Head coach Kathleen Parker fought the athletics department and the program began to practice on the grass fields by J.S. Coyne Stadium. 

A field hockey-specific AstroTurf was installed in 2005. The field was renovated in 2016. The team also use other practice facilities on the campus including the Carrier Dome and Manley Field House.

Season-by-season results
Season-by-season results through the end of the 2020 season.

* began competing in the Big East.† began competing in the ACC.

See also
List of NCAA Division I field hockey programs

References

External links